The Lord-Lieutenant of Inverness is the British monarch's personal representative in an area which has been defined since 1975 as consisting of the local government districts of Inverness, Badenoch and Strathspey, and Lochaber, in Scotland, and this definition was renewed by the Lord-Lieutenants (Scotland) Order 1996. The area of the lieutenancy used to be the county of Inverness, which was abolished as a local government area by Local Government (Scotland) Act 1973. The districts were created, by the 1973 act, as districts of the two-tier Highland region and abolished as local government areas under the Local Government etc. (Scotland) Act 1994, which turned the Highland region into a unitary council area.

List of Lord-Lieutenants of Inverness

Sir James Grant, 8th Baronet 17 March 1794 – 1809
Francis Ogilvy-Grant, 6th Earl of Seafield 2 September 1809 – 30 July 1853
Thomas Alexander Fraser, 12th Lord Lovat 26 August 1853 – 1873
Simon Fraser, 13th Lord Lovat 18 April 1873 – 6 September 1887
Donald Cameron, 24th Lochiel 17 October 1887 – 30 November 1905
Alfred Donald Mackintosh 11 December 1905 – 14 November 1938
Colonel Sir Donald Cameron, 25th Lochiel 2 January 1939 – 11 October 1951
Alexander Godfrey Macdonald, 7th Baron Macdonald 28 January 1952 – 29 November 1970
Sir Donald Hamish Cameron, 26th Lochiel 31 January 1971 –  1985
Lachlan Mackintosh 25 October 1985 – 26 December 1995
James Gray, Baron Gray of Contin 5 December 1996 – 2002
Donald Angus Cameron, 27th Lochiel 19 November 2002 – 3 August 2021
James Robert Edwards Wotherspoon 4 August 2021 - present

References

Inverness
 
Inverness-shire